KFXI (92.1 FM broadcasting) is a 100,000 watt radio station with a 600-foot tower, allowing it to reach further than other stations in the Chickasha, Duncan and Lawton markets. KFXI Foxy92 radio broadcasts a country music format and is known as "The Real Country Giant". Licensed to Marlow, Oklahoma, United States, with offices in Chickasha, Lawton, Duncan and Marlow, the station serves the Lawton, Duncan and Chickasha areas.  The station is currently owned by DFWU, Inc. and features programming from Fox News Radio.

References

External links
http://www.kfxi.com/

FXI
Radio stations established in 1990
1990 establishments in Oklahoma